Arruda is a surname.

Arruda also may refer to:

Places
Arruda DOC, a Portuguese wine region
Arruda dos Vinhos, a Portuguese municipality in Lisbon
, a parish in Rio Maior, Portugal
Estádio do Arruda, a multi-purpose stadium in Recife, Brazil

Other uses
Arruda–Boyce model, in continuum mechanics

See also

 Ribeirão Arrudas, Minas Gerais, Brazil; a stream
 , an Uruk period archaeological site in Mesopotamia